Symplocos peruviana is a species of plant in the family Symplocaceae. It is endemic to Peru.

References

Endemic flora of Peru
peruviana
Vulnerable plants
Trees of Peru
Taxonomy articles created by Polbot